Bishop Chulaparambil Memorial College for Women, also known as B.C.M. College, is a higher education institute  located in the heart of  Kottayam, Kerala. It was established in the year 1955. The college is affiliated with Mahatma Gandhi University. This college offers different courses in arts, commerce and science.

Departments

Science

Physics
Chemistry
Mathematics
Botany
Statistics
Zoology
Computer Science
Food Science
Home Science

Arts and Commerce

Malayalam
English
Hindi
Sociology
History
Economics
Psychology
Social Work
Physical Education
Commerce

Accreditation
The college is  recognized by the University Grants Commission (UGC) and is accredited with 'A' Grade

References

External links
http://www.bcmcollege.ac.in

Universities and colleges in Kottayam
Educational institutions established in 1955
1955 establishments in India
Arts and Science colleges in Kerala
Colleges affiliated to Mahatma Gandhi University, Kerala